The 1991 Birmingham Fire season was the first for the franchise in the inaugural season for the World League of American Football (WLAF). The team was led by head coach Chan Gailey, and played their home games at Legion Field in Birmingham, Alabama. They finished the season with a record of five wins and six losses (5–6), as the North America West division champions and with a loss against the Barcelona Dragons in the WLAF semifinals.

The Fire franchise was established in April 1990, and by November 1990 league officials announced play to begin in March 1991. With former Denver Broncos offensive coordinator Chan Gailey selected as head coach, the league held its inaugural draft in February 1991. Birmingham opened the season with a home loss to Montreal followed by a win over Sacramento. The Fire then alternated pairs of wins and losses for the remainder of the season. Although they finished with a record of only 5–5, the Fire qualified for the playoffs as the North America West division champions. In the WLAF semifinals, Birmingham lost to Barcelona 10–3 to finish the season 5–6.

Offseason
On April 18, 1990, Birmingham became the second U.S. city that was awarded a franchise after the Orlando Thunder to compete in the inaugural WLAF season. At the time of the announcement, league president Tex Schramm said that past support for professional football in Birmingham was a major reason for its selection for a franchise. In November, officials announced the league would begin play in March 1991 with ten teams. At that time it was also revealed that Birmingham would compete as a member of the North American West division with the Sacramento Surge and the San Antonio Riders. On December 21, 1990, Chan Gailey was introduced as the first head coach of the Fire.

Draft
In February 1991, the first WLAF Draft was held in Orlando, Florida. Unlike the NFL Draft, the WLAF version was carried out with individual positions being drafted over a period of several days. Offensive linemen were drafted on February 14; running backs, punters and placekickers on February 16; quarterbacks, wide receivers and tight ends on February 18; defensive linemen on February 20; linebackers on February 22; and defensive backs on February 24. In addition to those players drafted, each team had four European-born players assigned to their squad in a program called Operation Discovery. Players assigned through this program to the Fire were Pepe Moscatelli and Sergio Vissa from Italy and Andreas Motzkus and Hans-Ulrich Riecke from Germany.

Regular season

Schedule

Game summaries

Week 1: vs. Montreal Machine

In what was their first all-time game, the Fire were defeated by the Montreal Machine before 52,942 fans at Legion Field. Late in the first quarter, Birmingham's James Henry fumbled a punt that Montreal recovered at the 11-yard line of the Fire. Four plays later, the Machine took an early 3–0 lead after Björn Nittmo connected on a 22-yard field goal. Just as their first scoring drive started with a Birmingham special teams mistake, their second did as well. In the second quarter, a bad snap that went over the head of Fire punter Kirk Maggio gave the Machine possession at the Birmingham 17-yard line. Keith Jennings then scored the first touchdown of the game on a two-yard pass from Kevin Sweeney to give Montreal a 10–0 halftime lead. The Machine extended their lead to 13–0 after a 36-yard Nittmo field goal in the third before the Fire scored their first points in the fourth quarter. In the fourth, Birmingham scored first on a 35-yard field goal by Win Lyle and then were later awarded a safety after Montreal's Kevin Sweeney called for intentional grounding in the end zone to cut the lead to 13–5. However, Elroy Harris scored on a one-yard touchdown run with only 1:42 left in the game to seal the 20–5 Montreal victory.

In the loss, the Birmingham defense only allowed 179 yards of total offense, with only 33 yards coming through the air. On offense, the Fire gained 231 yards of total offense, with only 79 yards coming on the ground. Due to the larger than expected crowd, the start of the game was delayed 21 minutes to allow fans into the stadium as only two gates were open at Legion Field. With the loss, the Fire began their season at 0–1.

Week 2: vs. Sacramento Surge

Against the Sacramento Surge, the Fire recorded their first all-time victory with their 17–10 win in near freezing conditions before 16,432 fans at Legion Field. After a scoreless first quarter, the Fire took a 10–0 lead in the second only to have the Surge tie the game 10–10 at halftime. Birmingham scored on a 35-yard Win Lyle field goal and a 35-yard Joe Henderson touchdown run; Sacramento scored on a 20-yard Mike Elkins touchdown pass to Sam Archer and on a 25-yard Kendall Trainor field goal. Birmingham then scored the game-winning touchdown in the third quarter when John Miller intercepted an Elkins pass and returned it 99-yards for a touchdown and a 17–10 Fire lead. Sacramento did have a chance late in the fourth quarter to tie up the game. With a first-and-goal from the Fire two-yard line, Elkins threw four incomplete passes to turn the ball over on downs with 1:13 left in the game. With the win, the Fire evened their season record at 1–1.

Week 3: at Montreal Machine

In what was their first all-time road game the Fire were defeated by the 23–10 Montreal Machine, for the second time in three weeks, before 27,766 fans at Olympic Stadium in Montreal on a Monday night. The Machine took a 13–0 lead early in the first quarter after Richard Shelton scored a pair of defensive touchdowns. The first came on the first offensive play of the game when Shelton recovered a Joe Henderson fumble caused by Adam Bob and returned it 26-yards for a 7–0 lead. About five minutes later, Shelton intercepted a Brent Pease pass and returned it for a touchdown and a 13–0 lead after Björn Nittmo missed the extra point.

Birmingham responded in the second quarter with a 55-yard Pease touchdown pass to Stacey Mobley and a 20-yard Win Lyle field goal to cut the Montreal lead to 13–10. The Machine then scored late on a 39-yard Nittmo field goal to make the halftime score 16–10 in favor of the home team. A 41-yard Elroy Harris touchdown run late in the third was the final points of the game scored in the 23–10 Machine victory. In the game Birmingham outgained Montreal 181 to 39 in passing yardage and Montreal outgained Birmingham 154 to 73 in rushing yardage. With the loss, the Fire dropped to 1–2.

Week 4: vs. London Monarchs

Against the London Monarchs, the Fire were outgained in total offense 404 to 112 yards and were shut out 27–0 at Legion Field. The Monarchs took a 10–0 lead into halftime after David Smith scored on a six-yard touchdown run in the first and Phil Alexander connected on a 27-yard field goal in the second quarter. The Fire defense then shut out London in the third quarter, but 17 unanswered points in the fourth quarter secured the Monarchs' victory. In a span of 2:43, London quarterback Stan Gelbaugh threw touchdown passes of 33 and 13-yards to Andre Riley in the fourth quarter. Alexander then scored the final points of the game with his second 27-yard field goal of the game.

In the fourth quarter, Birmingham starting quarterback Brent Pease was replaced with back-up Eric Jones. Pease finished the game having completed 10-of-27 passes for 65 yards and Jones finished having completed 4-of-9 passes for 35 yards. With the loss, the Fire dropped to 1–3.

Week 5: at Orlando Thunder

In their second road game of the season, the Fire defeated the Orlando Thunder 31–6 at the Florida Citrus Bowl. J. J. Flannigan fumbled the opening kickoff for Orlando, which was recovered by Arthur Hunter for the Fire at the Thunder 13-yard line. The Orlando defense managed to hold the Fire after a goal line stand gave possession back to the Thunder at the Birmingham two-yard line. Three plays later, Myron Jones was tackled by Darrell Phillips for a safety and a 2–0 Birmingham lead. On the drive that ensued, the Fire scored their first touchdown of the game after Stacey Mobley threw a 15-yard touchdown pass to Brent Pease on a trick play for a 9–0 lead. Birmingham then extended their lead to 24–0 at halftime with a pair of second-quarter touchdowns. The first came on a 21-yard Pease pass to Willie Bouyer and the second when James Henry intercepted a Kerwin Bell pass and returned it 77-yards for a touchdown.

Early in the third quarter, Steve Williams had an apparent interception return for a touchdown negated by a false start penalty. On the next play, Pease threw an 87-yard touchdown pass to Willie Bouyer to give Birmingham a 31–0 lead. Orlando later scored their only points of the game late in the fourth quarter on a four-yard Myron Jones touchdown run. In the game, the Thunder had six turnovers as compared to zero for the Fire. The victory improved the Fire's record to 2–3.

Week 6: vs. San Antonio Riders

Against the San Antonio Riders, the Fire won 16–12 in rainy conditions at Legion Field. After a scoreless first quarter, Birmingham scored all 16 of their points during a 3.5 minute span in the second quarter. The first touchdown was scored on an 11-yard pass from Brent Pease to Steve Avery for a 7–0 lead. On the San Antonio possession that followed, Riders long snapper Eddie Grant snapped the ball over the head of punter Kent Sullivan out of the back of the end zone for a safety and a 9–0 Fire lead. Birmingham then scored their second touchdown on the possession that followed the safety with a 32-yard Pease pass to Avery for a 16–0 lead.

After a scoreless third quarter, San Antonio mounted a fourth quarter rally only to fall short and lose the game 16–12. After a 35-yard Jim Gallery field goal, the Riders scored their only touchdown on a 73-yard Mike Johnson pass to Lee Morris. With 1:30 remaining in the game, John Holland intercepted a Johnson pass; however, San Antonio held the Fire to force a punt. As they were punting from their own endzone, Kirk Maggio took the safety for Birmingham to set up a better free kick with only 0:22 left in the game. Arthur Hunter then intercepted a Johnson pass at the Fire two-yard line as time expired to preserve the Birmingham victory. The victory improved the Fire's record to 3–3.

Week 7: at Barcelona Dragons

In their first European road game of the season, the Fire lost 11–6 to the Barcelona Dragons at Montjuic Stadium in Spain. The Dragons scored their first points on the first offensive play of the game when Eric Lindstrom tackled Elroy Harris in the endzone for a safety and a 2–0 lead. In the second quarter Barcelona extended their lead to 8–0 after Lydell Carr scored on a three-yard touchdown run to complete an 89-yard drive. After a scoreless third quarter, Birmingham cut the Barcelona lead to 8–6 when Eric Jones threw a 42-yard touchdown pass to Stacey Mobley. Massimo Manca then provided for the final margin with his 26-yard field goal for the Dragons late in the game. In the game, Barcelona quarterback Tony Rice completed 20 of 25 passes for 354 yards passing. The loss brought the Fire's record to 3–4.

Week 8: at Frankfurt Galaxy

In their second consecutive European road game of the season, the Fire lost 10–3 to the Frankfurt Galaxy at Waldstadion in Germany. After a scoreless first quarter, Win Lyle converted a 43-yard field goal for the Fire and Tom Whelihan converted from 32-yards for the Galaxy for a 3–3 tie at halftime. The game-winning touchdown for Frankfurt was scored in the third quarter on a two-yard Tony Baker run. The loss brought the Fire's record to 3–5.

Week 9: vs. New York/New Jersey Knights

In what was their final regular season home game, the Fire defeated the New York/New Jersey Knights 24–14 at Legion Field. Birmingham took a 10–0 lead into halftime after Arthur Hunter intercepted a Jeff Graham pass and returned it 37-yards for a touchdown in the first and Win Lyle converted a 20-yard field goal in the second quarter. In the third quarter, the Fire extended their lead to 17–0 after a successful fake punt resulted in a touchdown when Kirk Maggio threw a 65-yard pass to Kenny Bell.

The Knights responded in the fourth quarter with a pair of touchdowns to cut the Fire lead to 17–14. The rally started after New York recovered a Willie Bouyer fumble at the Birmingham 25-yard line. On the next play, Jeff Graham threw a 25-yard touchdown pass to Eric Wilkerson. Later in the quarter, Fire quarterback Eric Jones fumbled the ball on a quarterback sack that was returned by Mark Moore 20-yards for a touchdown. However, the comeback was halted late in the fourth after Steve Hyche caused a Jeff Graham fumble that was returned 35-yards for a touchdown by Tony Bowick. The victory improved the Fire's record to 4–5.

Week 10: at Raleigh–Durham Skyhawks

In their final regular season game, the Fire defeated the Raleigh–Durham Skyhawks 28–7 at Carter–Finley Stadium to clinch a playoff spot as the North America West division champions. Birmingham opened the scoring with a five-yard Stacey Mobley touchdown run in the first, and Raleigh–Durham responded in the second quarter with a two-yard John Burch touchdown run to tie the game at 7–7 at halftime. Early in the third, the Fire took a 14–7 lead after James Henry returned a Skyhawks punt 50-yards for a touchdown. The third Birmingham touchdown was set up in the fourth quarter after Phil Ross recovered a Marvin Hargrove fumble at Raleigh–Durham 13-yard line. On the next play, Elroy Harris scored on a 13-yard touchdown run. Steve Avery then provided the final points in the 28–7 Fire victory with his nine-yard run. The victory improved the Fire's record to 5–5 as they entered the playoffs.

Postseason

Schedule

Game summary

WLAF Semifinal: vs. Barcelona Dragons

Against the Barcelona Dragons in the semifinals of the WLAF playoffs, the Fire lost 10–3 at Legion Field to complete their season. Although Barcelona defeated the Fire in their regular season matchup and had a better overall record, the game was played in Birmingham as the Fire were division champions and the Dragons entered the playoffs as a wild card since London won their division. After a scoreless first quarter, Barcelona scored all of their points in the second quarter. Massimo Manca converted a successful 25-yard field goal and Scott Erney threw a six-yard touchdown pass to Thomas Woods for a 10–0 lead. The only other points in the game came late in the fourth quarter when Win Lyle connected on a 28-yard field goal to make the final score 10–3. With their victory, Barcelona advanced to play the London Monarchs in World Bowl I at Wembley Stadium.

Staff

Final roster

Awards
After the completion of the regular season, the All-World League Team was selected by the league's ten head coaches. Overall, Birmingham had five players selected, with two on the first team and three on the second team. The five selections were:

John Brantley, Linebacker, 1st Team
John Miller, Free safety, 1st Team
Darrell Phillips, Nose tackle, 2nd Team
John Holland, Cornerback, 2nd Team
Kirk Maggio, Punter, 2nd Team

References

Birmingham Fire seasons
1991 in sports in Alabama